C. J. van Houten may refer to:

 Coenraad Johannes van Houten, inventor of the cocoa press
 Cornelis Johannes van Houten, Dutch astronomer and prolific discoverer of asteroids